Arshdeep Singh may refer to:
Arshdeep Singh (footballer, born 1994), Indian football forward
Arshdeep Singh (footballer, born 1997), Indian football goalkeeper
Arshdeep Singh (cricketer) (born 1999), Indian cricketer